"All the Same" is a song by Australian band Sick Puppies, released as the first single from their 2007 album Dressed Up as Life, although it was first released on their self-titled EP a year before the album. It reached No. 8 on the US Billboard Modern Rock Tracks chart and featured in the Free Hugs Campaign. The radio edit cuts off the middle of the second verse and end of the third verse, whereas there are no vocals in the third verse.

Music videos
The song has three music videos.

The first is the video of Juan Mann, a man in Sydney famous for initiating the Free Hugs Campaign. The video which has received over 77 million hits on YouTube to date has helped the band gain airplay in the United States.

The second is a video with both Juan Mann's Free Hugs Campaign and a live performance. The video went to No. 7 on Fuse TV's Number 1 Countdown.

The third is the first video without the Free Hugs Campaign. It has a storyline about Shimon and his love interest and the tumultuous relationship they are having. Between the girl's presumed infidelity and temper tantrums, he presumably gives up on the relationship. The band is seen performing outside buildings and it later rains with the band performing in the rain.

Track listing

Charts
"All the Same" is the second-most successful single of the band on the Alternative Songs chart (only behind "Maybe"), peaking at number 8, making it their first top-10 single ever and their debut on the US charts.

References

Sick Puppies songs
2006 singles
2006 songs
Rock ballads
Song recordings produced by Rock Mafia
Virgin Records singles
Songs written by Shimon Moore
Songs written by Tim James (musician)
Songs written by Antonina Armato
Songs written by Emma Anzai